KDAP-FM (96.5 FM) is a radio station licensed to serve Douglas, Arizona, United States, and parts of northern Sonora, Mexico.  The station is owned by Donna Henderson, personal representative. It airs a country music format as well as coverage of local community events.

History
KDAP first went on the air March 9, 1990. It was the sister station of KDAP AM (1450 kHz). This station was the second FM station and the fourth total radio station in the Douglas, AZ/Sulphur Springs Valley area. KDAP's studio and transmitter are located approximately 2 miles from the U.S./ Mexico border. This station has good signal strength both in the United States and in Mexico.  The call letters stand for Douglas/Agua Prieta, the towns on both sides of the border. KDAP-FM's sister station KDAP AM was sold in April 2015 to Alex Goodman who will continue to operate the AM station from their shared studios and transmitter site.

In November 2015, Howard Henderson, the original owner and licence holder died after a short illness. His wife Donna took over the ownership and continues to operate this station.

Ownership
Arizona MultiBank Community Development Corporation, in conjunction with the PPEP Micro-business and Housing Development Corporation in Tucson, provided funding for the purchase of both KDAP and KDAP-FM by Douglas Broadcasting, Inc. (Howard N. Henderson).

References

External links

DAP-FM
Country radio stations in the United States
Mass media in Cochise County, Arizona
Radio stations established in 1990
1990 establishments in Arizona